Walmer Osmar Gómez Martínez (born 17 August 1998) is a professional footballer who plays for USL Championship club Monterey Bay FC. Born in the United States, he represents the El Salvador national team.

Early life
Martinez was born in Santa Cruz, California to a Honduran father and his mother Lucila who was from  Victoria, Cabañas, El Salvador.

Club career

Youth and college 
Martinez attended Cabrillo College in 2016, playing two seasons with the Seahawks, scoring 22 goals in 35 appearances. In 2018, Martinez transferred to California State University, Monterey Bay where he scored 17 goals in 35 appearances.

While at college, Martinez appeared for USL League Two side Santa Cruz Breakers in both 2018 and 2019. He also appeared for Des Moines Menace towards the end of their 2019 season.

Professional 
Martinez signed with USL Championship side Hartford Athletic on April 12, 2021, after attending Hartford’s Invitational Combine. Martinez scored his first professional goals on October 26, 2021 when he scored a brace in Hartfrd's 2-0 win over the Charleston Battery.

On 22 December 2021, Martinez was announced as the first-ever signing by USL Championship expansion club Monterey Bay FC.

International career
Coach Hugo Pérez had approached Martinez about playing for the El Salvador under-23 for the 2020 CONCACAF Men's Olympic Qualifying Championship in March 2021, but he was unable to obtain a passport in time.

Martinez debuted with the El Salvador national football team in a 7–0 2022 FIFA World Cup qualification win over United States Virgin Islands on 5 June 2021 when he came on as a substitute.

Martinez scored his first goal for El Salvador on June 8, 2021 in the team's 3-0 win over Antigua and Barbuda.

References

External links 
 CSUMB bio
 

1998 births
Living people
Salvadoran footballers
El Salvador international footballers
American soccer players
Salvadoran people of Honduran descent
American sportspeople of Salvadoran descent
American people of Honduran descent
Association football forwards
Des Moines Menace players
Hartford Athletic players
Soccer players from California
USL Championship players
USL League Two players
Sportspeople from Santa Cruz, California
Cabrillo College alumni
Cal State Monterey Bay Otters
California State University, Monterey Bay alumni
College men's soccer players in the United States
Monterey Bay FC players